Oreostemma alpigenum (formerly Aster alpigenus) is a perennial plant to subshrub in the family Asteraceae of the mountains of western United States, commonly known as tundra aster or Anderson's mountain crown.

References

Astereae
Flora of the Sierra Nevada (United States)
Flora without expected TNC conservation status